Establishment Creek is a stream in Ste. Genevieve County in the U.S. state of Missouri. It is a tributary of the Mississippi River.

The stream is impounded as Lake Wanda Lee just south of Rocky Ridge.

Establishment Creek was so named on account of pioneer settlement along its course, establishment meaning "settlement" in French.

See also
List of rivers of Missouri

References

Rivers of Ste. Genevieve County, Missouri
Rivers of Missouri